The Miracle Worker refers to a broadcast, a play and various other adaptations of Helen Keller's 1903 autobiography The Story of My Life. The first of these works was a 1957 Playhouse 90 broadcast written by William Gibson and starring Teresa Wright as Anne Sullivan and Patricia McCormack as Keller. Gibson adapted his teleplay for a 1959 Broadway production with Patty Duke as Keller and Anne Bancroft as Sullivan. The 1962 film also starred Bancroft and Duke. Subsequent television films were released in 1979 and in 2000.

Source of the name
The title originates in Mark Twain's description of Sullivan as a "miracle worker". He admired both women, and although his personal finances were problematic, he helped arrange the funding of Keller's Radcliffe College education by his friend, financier and industrialist Henry Huttleston Rogers.

Play

Film 
 The Miracle Worker (1962 film) with Anne Bancroft as Annie Sullivan and Patty Duke as Helen Keller
 The Miracle Worker (1979 film) with Patty Duke as Annie Sullivan and Melissa Gilbert as Helen Keller
 The Miracle Worker (2000 film) with Alison Elliott as Annie Sullivan and Hallie Kate Eisenberg as Helen Keller

External links

 
 
 
 
 

 
1959 plays
1962 films
1979 television films
1979 films
2000 television films
2000 films
Helen Keller
American television films
Films set in Alabama
American biographical films
1960s American films
1970s American films
2000s American films